Miloslav Valouch (4 August 1878, Lazce – 13 March 1952, Prague) was a Czechoslovak physicist and mathematician.

External links
MacTutor Bio 

Czechoslovak physicists
Czechoslovak mathematicians
1878 births
1952 deaths
Scientists from Olomouc